Karen Ghrawi is a Lebanese beauty pageant titleholder/ Interior Designer who was crowned Miss Lebanon 2013. She represented Lebanon at the Miss Universe 2013 in Russia/Moscow and Miss World 2013 in Indonesia/Bali pageants.

Early life
She is half German. Her hobbies include swimming, cooking and traveling. She pursues to this day her career as an Interior Designer.

Miss Lebanon 2013
Ghrawi was crowned Miss Lebanon 2013 on Sunday 1 September 2013. The beauty pageant was hosted by journalist and TV personality Dima Sadek and aired on LBCI and LDC. She competed at Miss Universe 2013 and Miss World 2013, but was unplaced in both pageants.

During the Miss Lebanon 2014 beauty pageant, she tripped on her high heels and fell on stage during her final walk, just before handing over her crown to Saly Greige. The clip of her fall quickly went viral and was included in the "Top Five Celebrities Slipping off the Stage" list by MTV.

See also 
 Miss Lebanon

References

External links
 Official Website 
 LBCI website

1991 births
Living people
Lebanese beauty pageant winners
Miss Universe 2013 contestants
Miss World 2013 delegates
Artists from Beirut
Lebanese American University alumni
Lebanese Christians